Buk District (Buk-gu) is a district situated in the northern part of the city of Gwangju, South Korea.  It is similar to a ward in the United States. The district is by far the most populated district in Gwangju, and elects two lawmakers for the South Korean National Assembly. Gwangju Station is here.

References

External links
Buk-gu homepage